Bhartiya Skill Development University  also known as BSDU University is a private university located in Jaipur, Rajasthan, India.

References

External links
 

Educational institutions established in 2017
Private universities in India
2017 establishments in Rajasthan